Streptococcus mitis is a mesophilic alpha-hemolytic species of Streptococcus that inhabits the oral cavity. It is coccus (spherical shaped), gram-positive, catalase negative, and facultative anaerobe. It was previously classified as Streptococcus mitior. Streptococcus mitis is known to cause several medical conditions one of them being infective endocarditis.

Classification 
Members of the Streptococcus genera belong to lactic acid bacteria defined by the formation of lactic acid as an end-product of carbohydrate metabolism. The family Streptococcaceae is characterized by based upon its 16S rRNA gene sequence analysis within the low (< 50 mol%) G+C branch. There are over 50 species in the genus which are classified by their 16S rRNA sequences.

Habitat 
Streptococcus mitis primarily resides in the oral cavity which includes the mouth, nasopharynx, and throat. However, there have also been cases of it in the female genital tract, the gastrointestinal tract, and even in the integumentary system.

Natural genetic transformation

S. mitis is competent for natural genetic transformation.  Thus S. mitis cells are able to take up exogenous DNA and incorporate exogenous sequence information into their genome by homologous recombination. These bacteria can employ a predatory fratricidal mechanism for active acquisition of homologous DNA.

Moon Surveyor 3 Probe

Approach 
It has been reported that Streptococcus mitis identified and survived for over two years on the Surveyor 3 probe on the Moon. However, many NASA scientists speculate that this is most probably due to contamination upon return to Earth. The Apollo 12 crew received pieces of Surveyor in 1969, one of these was the TV camera. The probe was then analyzed to consider how the lunar environment affected the material. Surveyor 3 had not been sterilized before its launch because scientists wanted to see if organisms could survive the two and half years on the moon, so looking for surviving organic material was a part of this analysis.

Results 
Upon inspection, a group found an amount of S. mitis inside a piece of foam located inside the camera. Culture plates were made and the identity was later confirmed as Streptococcus mitis at the US Communicable Disease Center at Atlanta, Georgia. At first, it was speculated that S. mitis had been picked up from the moon but research later discovered that the residence of the bacteria on the probe had started after the probe returned.

Characteristics of Streptococcus mitis

References

External links
 S. mitis subdural empyema from MedPix
 Type strain of Streptococcus mitis at BacDive -  the Bacterial Diversity Metadatabase

Streptococcaceae
Gram-positive bacteria